Joop Kamstra (10 October 1905 – 24 April 1957) was a Dutch athlete. He competed in the men's high jump at the 1928 Summer Olympics.

References

1905 births
1957 deaths
Athletes (track and field) at the 1928 Summer Olympics
Dutch male high jumpers
Olympic athletes of the Netherlands
Place of birth missing